(born November 7, 1951 as  in Nagoya, Japan) is a Japanese science fiction author and founder of Studio Nue. Takachiho is best known as the creator of Crusher Joe, Dirty Pair and Dirty Pair Flash. Helen McCarthy in 500 Essential Anime Movies called him one of Japan's leading pulp novelists

Takachiho established the anime production house Studio Nue in 1972, working as an anime producer and scenario writer, while still a student at Hosei University. He graduated three years later, in 1975, in social science. In 1977 Takachiho made his authorial debut with his novel "Crusher Joe: Rentai Wakusei Pizan no Kiki" ("Crusher Joe: Crisis on Solidarity Planet Pizan"). Two of Takachiho's stories have won Seiun Awards, "Daatipea no Dai Boken" ("Great Adventure of The Dirty Pair")  for Best Japanese Short Story in 1980, and "Dirty Pair no Dai Gyakuten" ("The Dirty Pair Strike Again") for Best Japanese Novel in 1986. He held the title of Executive Secretary of the Science Fiction & Fantasy Writers of Japan (SFWJ) until the end of 1997.

Dirty Pair

The inspiration for Dirty Pair novels was a visit to Japan by the British Australian SF author A. Bertram Chandler, in August 1977. On his itinerary was a stop at the young Studio Nue, which Takachiho co-founded. As something to entertain their guest, two of the staffers there, Yuri Tanaka and Keiko Otoguro, hit upon the idea with Takachiho of taking Chandler to a tournament of the All Japan Women's Pro-Wrestling organization, which was a member of the World Women's Wrestling Association (WWWA). The card included the highly-popular wrestling (and singing) team, the Beauty Pair.  Something that passed among the foursome during that match led Chandler to remark to Takachiho something to the effect that "the two women in the ring may be the Beauty Pair, but those two with you ought to be called 'the Dirty Pair'."

This became the germ of an idea for a novella Takachiho decided to write, transplanting the rough-housing of pro-wrestling to the realm of space-opera mystery stories, with which he already had experience in his already successful Crusher Joe series. The team code-name "Lovely Angels" is also a play on the names of certain women's teams of the time, such as the Queen Angels.

Works
 Crusher Joe series
  "Crisis on Solidarity Planet Pizanne"  (November, 1977)
  "Extermination! The Space Pirates Trap" (January, 1978)
  "The Final Secret of the Milky Way"  (April, 1978)
  "Cave of the Cult of the Dark God" (July, 1978)
  "Treachery Toward the Galactic Empire" December, 1978)
  "Challenge of the Human-faced Demon Beasts" (June, 1979)
  "The Beautiful Demon King" (March, 1983)
  "Kukuru, the Haunted City" (Part 1: November, 1989; Part 2: March, 1990)
  "The Phantom Beast Wormwood " (October, 2003)
  "The Holy Virgin Dairon" (May, 2005)
  Crusher Joe extra series 
  "Rainbow-colored Hell" (February, 2003)
  "The Doruroi Storm" (December, 1986) (* originally published as side story' rather than extra series by Asahi Sonorama)

 ''Dirty Pair series  "The Dirty Pair's Great Adventures" (serialized 1979; book May 1980)
  "The Dirty Pair Strike Again" (August 1985)
  "DP's Rough and Tumble" (March 1987)
  "DP's Great Escape" (March 1993)
  "DP's Great Resurrection" (August, 2004)
  "DP's Great Conquest" (April, 2006)
  "DP's Great Empire" (October, 2007)
  "DP side story: Legacy of the Dictator" (August 26, 1998)
 Dirty Pair Flash'' series
  "Melancholy of the Angels" (December 1994)
  "Smiles of the Angels" (January 1997)
  "Prankster Angels" (September, 1999)
  "Li Zuilong of the Divine Fist" aka "Lee Suiron the Godhand" series
1.  "Magic Castle of the Shining Night Pearl" (July, 1997)
2.  "Holy Grail of Kiian" (October, 1997)
3.  "Lament of Heartless Valley" (April, 1998)
4.  "Rose Witch" (August, 1998)
5.  "The Beauteous Acrobatic Troupe" (December, 1999)
 "Legend of the Galaxy's Strongest. Chapter:Hungry Wolf" (October, 1997)
 "Legend of the Galaxy's Strongest. Chapter:Phoenix" (April, 1999)
 "Legend of the Galaxy's Strongest. Chapter:Serpents&Scorpions" (October, 2000)
  "Nonhuman Romance of the Three Kingdoms" series
  "Norie is a General!?" (Book1: October, 1992; Book2: October, 1993) 
  "Magic Sword of Gamos"  (Book1: July, 1994; Book2: April, 1996; Book 3: November, 1998)
  "Smuggler Sam" series
  "Galactic unchartered zone" (November 1980)
  "Tower of the Holy Beast" (October 1983)

  "Berserk warrior Ai" series
  (June, 1988; January, 1993)
  "Part 2:Conspiratorial Murder Cult" (January 1990; February, 1993)

  "The Dark-Fist Hagiography" series
  "Prince of Darkness" (August, 1988)
  "Prince of Silence" (September, 1990)
   "Prince of Illusion" (March, 1995)

  series
  "Awaken the Dragon" (January, 1981)
  "Myth of Sorcery" (3 vols.; May, 1986; July, 1987; October, 1988)

individual titles
  "Wolves' Wilderness"  (April, 1981)
  "Warrior from Another World" (Tsuru Shobō: February, 1979; Tokuma Shoten: May, 1981) 
  "Beautiful Beast: Warrior of the Gods" (2 vols.; April 1985)
  "Summer, Wind, Rider" (May, 1984)
  "Hill Climber" (July, 2009)

References

External links
Takachiho Notes, Haruka Takachiho's personal webpage
SFWJ Profile (author's webpage onf the SF Writers of Japan homepage)
Interview in EX volume 2.8
Entry in The Encyclopedia of Science Fiction

People from Nagoya
Japanese science fiction writers
1951 births
Living people
Dirty Pair